Kristin "Krista" Siegfrids (born 4 December 1985) is a Finnish pop singer. She represented Finland in the Eurovision Song Contest 2013 with her entry "Marry Me". Siegfrids' debut album, named Ding Dong!, was released in May 2013. As a television presenter, she hosted Uuden Musiikin Kilpailu from 2016 to 2020.

Early life 
Siegfrids was born into the Swedish-speaking minority in Kaskinen in western Finland. Her mother tongue is Swedish, though Siegfrids also speaks fluent Finnish and English. She studied in Vaasa to be a teacher. Siegfrids has three siblings.

Career

2009–2012: Daisy Jack and The Voice 
Siegfrids started her career with her band Daisy Jack in 2009. Their first single was Perfect Crime, released in October 2011. She achieved her first musical role in the musical, Play Me (2009–2010) at the Swedish Theatre in Helsinki. Her next major career step was to be cast in the rock musical Muskettisoturit, (The Three Musketeers, 2011) at the Finnish Peacock Theatre in Helsinki. Siegfrids participated in the first season of The Voice of Finland (2011–2012) but was dropped in the semifinals.

2013–2015: Eurovision Song Contest and Ding Dong! 

Siegfrids participated in Uuden Musiikin Kilpailu 2013 for the Eurovision Song Contest 2013 with the song "Marry Me". The 27-year-old Siegfrids won the contest held at Barona Areena by attaining the maximum vote of both the public and judges. She was elected to represent Finland in Malmö. During her performance, she shared a kiss with one of the female dancers on stage. According to Siegfrids, the act was a part of the show and urged Finland to legalize same-sex marriage. On 16 May, her entry made it to the final of the Eurovision on 18 May. However, in the finals it finished 24th out of the 26 countries with a total of 13 points.

According to the Executive Supervisor of the Eurovision Song Contest, Jon Ola Sand, Turkey had announced in November that it would not participate in the Eurovision Song Contest. Though the channel promised to show the contest, Turkey's TRT cancelled showing the semifinal and the finals over what LGBT activists alleged was fears of Siegfrids' promised lesbian kiss. When China broadcast the Eurovision Song Contest in October 2013, officials aired Siegfrid's performance but removed the kiss as a result of the television censorship in China and violation of Chinese ethics, sparking outrage among Eurovision fans in the country.

Siegfrids' debut album, Ding Dong!, was released on 10 May 2013.  Later, it was announced that she would be a guest on Big Brother's Bit on the Side, a spin-off of the British version of Big Brother. She represented Finland in the Sopot Festival in concert "Top of the Top" on 23 August 2013 with her entry "Marry Me". Siegfrieds was the spokesperson for Finland in the Eurovision Song Contest 2015 in Vienna and gave the top mark of twelve points to Sweden's Måns Zelmerlöw and his song "Heroes", which went on to win the contest.

2016–present: Melodifestivalen and Uuden Musiikin Kilpailu 
Siegfrids has presented Uuden Musiikin Kilpailu, the Finnish national selection show for Eurovision since 2016. At the same time she participated in the Swedish national selection show Melodifestivalen 2016 with the song "Faller", but did not advance from second semifinal after placing fifth. In September, she signed a contract with Universal Music Sweden and Stereoscope Scandinavia. She participated in third semifinal Melodifestivalen 2017 with the song "Snurra min jord", but did not advance after placing seventh.

For the Eurovision Song Contest 2021, she hosted Krista Calling, a backstage series broadcast on Eurovision's official YouTube channel.

Personal life 
Siegfrids was married to Finnish radio presenter and stand-up comedian  from 2017 to 2019. As of 2020, she lives in Amsterdam, Netherlands, with her Dutch boyfriend. They have a daughter born in 2020.

Discography

Albums

Singles

As lead artist

As featured artist

Music videos

References

External links 
Official website (archived)

1985 births
Living people
People from Kaskinen
Swedish-speaking Finns
Finnish pop singers
Eurovision Song Contest entrants for Finland
Eurovision Song Contest entrants of 2013
Articles containing video clips
Finnish television presenters
Finnish LGBT rights activists
English-language singers from Finland
Swedish-language singers
21st-century Finnish women singers
Finnish women television presenters
Finnish expatriates in the Netherlands
Finnish pop musicians
Finnish women activists
Melodifestivalen contestants of 2017
Melodifestivalen contestants of 2016